is a private university in Takarazuka, Hyōgo, Japan, established in 1987.

Campus
Takarazuka Campus (School of Art & Design and Media Design): 7-27, Hanayashiki-Tsutsujigaoka, Takarazuka, Hyogo
Umeda Campus, Osaka (School of Nursing): 13-16, Shibata 1-chome, Kita-ku, Osaka
Shinjuku Campus, Tokyo (Tokyo School of Media Content): 11-1 Nishi-Shinjuku 7-chome, Shinjuku, Tokyo

External links
 

Educational institutions established in 1987
Private universities and colleges in Japan
Universities and colleges in Hyōgo Prefecture
1987 establishments in Japan
Takarazuka, Hyōgo